Alison Coffin  (born 1970) is a Canadian politician, who was formerly the leader of the Newfoundland and Labrador New Democratic Party (NL NDP). She is a former member of the Newfoundland and Labrador House of Assembly. In her professional life, she has developed policy and strategic plans for the provincial government, taught at Memorial University, and consulted on public policy, pension plans, and the provincial budget. For several years, she also ran a successful consulting company.

Background
Coffin was born in Corner Brook and was raised in Joe Batt's Arm along with two brothers. She graduated from Memorial University with an economics degree in 1993 and later completed her master's degree at York University in Toronto, graduating in 1997. She splits her time between St. John's, Brigus, and Spaniard's Bay with her partner Ian Coombs.

Professionally, Coffin is an economist and university professor. Her most recent professional publication, "Taking Politics out of Governance", included in The Democracy Cookbook outlines straightforward suggestions for better provincial budgeting, spending, and planning.

Politics
Coffin ran for the NL NDP in the 2015 provincial election in Waterford Valley. She ran for the provincial party leadership election in April 2018, losing to MHA Gerry Rogers. After Rogers resigned, Coffin was elected leader unopposed in March 2019. She was confirmed as the party's new leader at a news conference on March 5, 2019. Coffin is a former associate president of the provincial party.

Coffin led the party into the 2019 provincial election; despite only nominating 14 candidates (out of a possible 40) the party won 3 seats. Coffin won St. John's East-Quidi Vidi holding it for the NDP, while the party led St. John's Centre, and won an upset in Labrador West.

Coffin led the party into the 2021 provincial election. She was personally defeated in her district of St. John's East-Quidi Vidi; while the party held St. John's Centre and Labrador West. Coffin filed for a recount. On May 12, 2021, Supreme Court Justice Donald Burrage rejected Coffin's bid for a recount, arguing that there was not sufficient evidence.

On October 16, 2021, Coffin lost a leadership review by party members. She later chose to resign on October 19 and was replaced by MHA Jim Dinn as interim leader.

Electoral history

References 

Leaders of the Newfoundland and Labrador NDP/CCF
Newfoundland and Labrador political party leaders
Newfoundland and Labrador New Democratic Party MHAs
Living people
People from Corner Brook
Politicians from St. John's, Newfoundland and Labrador
21st-century Canadian politicians
21st-century Canadian women politicians
Female Canadian political party leaders
Women MHAs in Newfoundland and Labrador
1970 births